Stefanos Siontis (born 4 September 1987) is a Greek professional footballer who plays as a defensive midfielder for Super League 2 club Panserraikos.

He was also part of Greece Under 21 team.

Career
On 1 July 2009 Kavala announced the transfer of Siontis for an undisclosed fee.   On 27 July 2011, he signed a 1-year contract with Panetolikos.

On 23 August 2013 Veria announced the transfer of Siontis on a free transfer. His contract is due to expire on June 30, 2014.

After Kerkyra's relegation Siontis was released on a free transfer. On 26 August 2015, Siontis returned to Veria as he signed a one-year contract. Siontis debuted on 29 August 2015 for Veria in an away match against Panthrakikos, he played the entire match. On 13 May 2018, PAS Giannina officially announced the signing of experienced defensive midfielder Stefanos Siontis on a two years' contract, who was released from Kerkyra The 31-year-old player  scored one goal at 25 Superleague performances with manager Giannis Matzourakis' team during 2017-18 season.

On 13 May 2018 Siontis signed for 2 years with PAS Giannina.

Honours 
PAS Giannina

 Super League Greece 2: 2019–20

References

External links
Profile at epae.org
 Guardian Football

1987 births
Living people
Greek footballers
Greek expatriate footballers
Greece youth international footballers
Super League Greece players
Cypriot First Division players
Panathinaikos F.C. players
Ethnikos Asteras F.C. players
Kavala F.C. players
Panetolikos F.C. players
Doxa Katokopias FC players
Veria F.C. players
PAE Kerkyra players
PAS Giannina F.C. players
Panserraikos F.C. players
Expatriate footballers in Cyprus
Association football defenders
Footballers from Ioannina